Sergeant Paul H. Weinert (July 15, 1869 – January 19, 1919) was an American soldier in the U.S. Army who served with the 1st U.S. Artillery during the Indian Wars. He was one of twenty men who received the Medal of Honor for gallantry at what was then called the Battle of Wounded Knee, but now commonly called the Wounded Knee Massacre, taking charge of the battery when his commanding officer was severely wounded, on December 29, 1890.

Biography
Paul H. Weinert was born in Frankfurt, Germany on July 15, 1869. He later emigrated to the United States and joined the United States Army from Baltimore, Maryland in November 1886 (claiming to be 21 because he was underage). He was assigned to Battery E of the 1st U.S. Artillery and became a Corporal by age 20.

Weinert was present at the Wounded Knee Massacre when, on the morning of December 29, 1890, members of the 7th U.S. Cavalry Regiment surrounded the camp of the Sioux chieftain Big Foot in order to apprehend weapons from his band. His unit, consisting of four Hotchkiss guns, moved in after the fighting started and began giving artillery support to the cavalry troops. When his commanding officer, Lieutenant Harry Hawthorne, was severely wounded he assumed command and, with another soldier, directed artillery fire and successfully cleared out a key position, a ravine "pocket", occupied by a number of the Sioux warriors. He and the second cannoneer remained under heavy fire during the battle, at one point causing a round to be knocked out of Weinert's hands as he was about to load, resulting in the gun carriage being riddled with bullets. The two continued manually moving the cannon with each discharge to move it into a better position until the end of the battle. For his actions, he received the Medal of Honor along with four other artillerymen. He was discharged in 1895, and served again from 1898 until 1899.

Weinert died in Milton, Massachusetts on January 19, 1919, at the age of 49. He is one of two MOH recipients, along with Edward A. Gisburne, interred at Milton Cemetery.

Medal of Honor citation
Rank and organization: Corporal, Company E, 1st U.S. Artillery. Place and date: At Wounded Knee Creek, S. Dak., 29 December 1890. Entered service at: Baltimore, Md. Birth: Germany. Date of issue: 24 March 1891.

Citation:

Taking the place of his commanding officer who had fallen severely wounded, he gallantly served his piece, after each fire advancing it to a better position.

See also

List of Medal of Honor recipients for the Indian Wars

References

Further reading
Jensen, Richard E., ed. Voices of the American West: The Settler And Soldier Interviews of Eli S. Ricker, 1903-1919. Vol. 1. Lincoln: University of Nebraska Press, 2005.

External links

1869 births
1919 deaths
American military personnel of the Indian Wars
United States Army Medal of Honor recipients
Military personnel from Frankfurt
People from Milton, Massachusetts
United States Army soldiers
German-born Medal of Honor recipients
German emigrants to the United States
American Indian Wars recipients of the Medal of Honor
Pine Ridge Campaign